The siege of Fukuyo was one of many steps taken by Takeda Shingen in his bid to seize control of Shinano Province. The fortress at Fukuyo lay in the Ina valley, south of Lake Suwa. Tozawa Yorichika, an ally of Takatō Yoritsugu, lord of Takatō castle, surrendered quickly. The Battle of Ankokuji followed the siege.

References
Turnbull, Stephen (1998). 'The Samurai Sourcebook'. London: Cassell & Co.

1542 in Japan
Fukuyo 1542
Conflicts in 1542
Fukuyo 1542
Fukuyo